Lucero de México (Lucero of Mexico) is the ninth album from Mexican pop music singer and actress Lucero, and her second Mariachi album. It was released in 1992. It is one of the best selling albums of mariachi music in Méxican history, with sales of over 2 million copies.

Track listing
The album is composed by 12 songs, all of them were arranged by different songwriters.

Singles

Chart performance
This was the third album of Lucero that entered to the list of Billboard and the first that charted in 2 different lists. The album stayed in the chart of the Top Latin Albums just for 2 weeks peaking at #45; and it stayed in the Regional Mexican Albums for 21 weeks, peaking at No. 6.

References

1992 albums
Lucero (entertainer) albums